Peringanadu is a small village in Pathanamthitta district, Kerala state, India. It is known by the presence of Peringanadu Trichenda Mangalam Mahadeva Temple.

Culture

Peringanad is a small village located near Adoor. 
the village boasts of secular feeling entrenched in its soul. It is expressed through various festivals and celebrations, prominent among them are ulsavam in the month of March–April, the Christian festivals of valiya perunnal at peringanad valiya pally and  St. Gregorios and St. George. 
The very famous Shiva Temple, Peringanad Trichenda Mangalam Mahadeva Temple is located here. The Temple is famous for its 'Kettu Kazhcha' during the annual festival. Kettu Kazhcha is the procession of huge chariot(thaeru) and bull(Kaala) made of wood and cloth by groups belonging to different areas(kara).

Marthashmooni Orthodox Valiya Pally is called "poovankunnu pally "(Malankara Orthodox Syrian Church), established in 1850 AD, located at Moonnalam-Peringand, is the first church in the name of Marthashmooni (Marth Shmooni /St. Shmuni), her Seven Children and their teacher Mar Eliazer (St. Eliazer) in India. Perunnal on Makaram 14,15 (Malayalam era). The daughter church St. Gregorious Orthodox Church is also located at this place. 
   

Famous Malayalam satirist E.V. Krishna Pillai lived in Peringanad. Adoor Bhasi, a famous comedian in Malayalam Cinema, is the son of E.V. Krishna Pillai. Malayalam writer Munshi Paramu Pillai also belongs to Peringanad.

Demographics
 India census, Peringanadu had a population of 20785 with 9894 males and 10891 females.

See also 
 Adoor
 Adoor Gopalakrishnan
 College of Engineering Adoor
 Pathanamthitta

References

External links
of Thrichennamangalam Mahadeva Temple
Official website from the Govt. of Kerala
Official website of Pathanamthitta district
Information pages of Pathanamthitta district

Villages in Pathanamthitta district